Igor Durlovski (born 26 March 1977 in Bitola), is a Macedonian bass opera singer and politician.

Life and career
Durlovski was born in Bitola, SR Macedonia, part of SFR Yugoslavia, now North Macedonia, in 1977. He graduated from the Faculty of Music at Ss. Cyril and Methodius University in Skopje. He made his international debut at the Wiener Kammeroper in 2001 as Nonacourt in Nino Rota's  Il cappello di paglia di Firenze. That year he also began further voice study with mezzo-soprano and Kammersängerin Olivera Miljaković. He was also a laureate at the International "Jeunesses Musicales" competition in Belgrade. Since the 2009/2010 season he has appeared regularly at the Staatstheater Kassel.

On the concert platform Durlovski has appeared as a soloist in Beethoven's Ninth Symphony, the Verdi and Mozart Requiems, Dimitrije Bužarovski's Radomir Psalter, 's oratorio To Clement, and Risto Avramovski's Winter symphony. He has sung with the Vienna Residence Orchestra, East-West Symphony Orchestra, Belgrade Philharmonic Orchestra, Sofia Philharmonic Orchestra, and ALEA contemporary music ensemble.

He is married to opera singer , with whom he opens the Durlovski Opera Academy in 2019.

In 2020, it is announced that Igor Durlovski is Independent candidate list for VMRO-DPMNE in the fifth constituency, including Bitola, Ohrid, Prilep and Kicevo for the early parliamentary elections scheduled for 15 July 2020.

Storming of Macedonian Parliament 

Durlovski was among the organizers of protests following the parliamentary election in December 2016. In November, Durlovski was arrested, along with at least 30 people, under the charges of “terrorist endangerment of the constitutional order and security. The following day several hundred people, led by former Prime Minister Nikola Gruevski and other high-ranking VMRO DPMNE party members, protested in front of the Skopje Criminal Court demanding the immediate release of all who were detained. Since the arrest, there have been several formal and informal symbolic protests, in the Republic of Macedonia and abroad, organized primarily by Durlovski's colleagues and acquaintances, demanding his release from custody. On 15 March 2019 the Court jailed 16 people involved in the 2017 mob attack, and acquitted Igor Durlovski of all charges.

Sources
 National Opera and Ballet. Igor Durlovski - first soloist
 Staatstheater Kassel. Igor Durlovski Bass

References

External links
Performance schedule on Operabase

21st-century Macedonian male singers
Operatic basses
1977 births
People from Bitola
Living people
21st-century male opera singers
VMRO-DPMNE politicians
Members of the Assembly of North Macedonia